Machias Memorial High School (MMHS) is a public secondary school (grades 9–12) located in Machias, Maine, United States. The school was originally established in 1850 as Machias High School, and was later renamed to honor students and alumni who died while serving in the military.

The school is a member of Alternative Organization Structure (AOS) 96. MMHS students are residents of Machias as well as the neighboring towns of Jonesboro, Marshfield, Northfield, Roque Bluffs, Wesley, Whitneyville, East Machias, Machiasport, Cutler, and Whiting.

The school mascot is a bulldog, and the school colors are orange and black. The school yearbook, the Margaretta, is named after HMS Margaretta, a British schooner captured on the Machias River during the American Revolutionary War.

News and initiatives

MMHS was selected to participate in a five-year high school initiative called Models, Networks and Policies to Support and Sustain Rigor and Relevance for ALL Students, supported by the Bill & Melinda Gates Foundation.

Sports

MMHS competes in the Eastern Division of Class D high school sports. The Bulldogs hold a number of state and regional championship titles, including soccer, basketball (boys), and cheerleading titles.
MMHS offers many sports. These sports include Girls' Volleyball (Class B), Co-ed Cross Country (Class C), and Soccer in the fall, Boys' Basketball, Girls' Basketball and Cheering in the winter, and in the spring Baseball and Softball.

References

External links
MMHS website

Public high schools in Maine
Educational institutions established in 1850
Schools in Washington County, Maine
Machias, Maine
1850 establishments in Maine